Hakanpää is a Finnish surname. Notable people with the surname include:

Jani Hakanpää (born 1992), Finnish ice hockey player
Rami Hakanpää (born 1978), Finnish footballer

Finnish-language surnames
Surnames of Finnish origin